Batuan, officially the Municipality of Batuan,  is a 5th class municipality in the province of Bohol, Philippines. According to the 2020 census, it has a population of 13,845 people.

It is accessible via the Tagbilaran–Loay–Carmen national road or the Tagbilaran–Balilihan–Batuan provincial road. It marches with Sagbayan to the north, with Bilar to the south, with Carmen and Valencia to the east, and with Catigbian and Balilihan to the west.

Batuan covers a total area of  comprising fifteen barangays as per the Municipal Comprehensive Development Plan for 1983–1992. However, a certification of the land area of Batuan, issued by ARED for operations, DENR Regional Office Region No. 7 Cebu City on 26 November 2001 at the instance of the LGU in connection with its Comprehensive Land Use Plan (CLUP) preparation work, showed a land area of only , but that included only eleven barangays and excluded four—Quirino, Aloja, Behind the Clouds and Garcia.

The town of Batuan, Bohol celebrates its fiesta on July 25, to honor the town patron Saint James.

History 
This interior town used to be a barrio of Bilar during the Spanish regime and was called Lindugon. During the early years of the American regime, this barrio was made into a municipality by Act No. 968 dated Oct 31, 1903 that provided the following: “The Municipality of Batuan shall consist of the territory of the barrio of Batuan in the present Municipality of Bilar, with the seat of the municipal government at the present barrio of Batuan.” (Acts of the Philippine Commission, Vol. XIV. Washington: Government Printing Office, 1904).

Batuan became a separate municipality through the efforts of some local leaders, such as Manuel Decasa, Alejandro Barril, Victor Tiongson, among others, who were put behind bars for strongly advocating the movement to cede Batuan from its mother town Bilar, and its subsequent creation as a distinct and separate town. Notwithstanding, those leaders pursued their aspirations after release from prison. Municipality of Batuan was created, originally comprising only five barangays namely: Lindugon, Cambacay, Rosariohan, Janlud and Cantigdas; but today comprising fifteen.

The early years of local administration saw its seat at Lindugon, now Poblacion Vieja. In 1911 however, the Municipal Hall, the seat of local government, was transferred to sitio Tinagacan for reasons of accessibility. Eventually, the parish church was also relocated to its present site at the Poblacion.

Batuan got its name from edible fruit with the same name, which grew galore in the locality. Today though these trees can hardly be found in the area.

During the Japanese occupation, Batuan was a haven of evacuees from the provinces of Cebu, Leyte and from other parts of the island/province. It was at the Batuan Central School site where the unification of the guerilla forces of Bohol was forged on 29 June 1942, paving the way for the creation of the Bohol Area Command (BAC) under the command of Major Ismael Ingeniero, whose election was hotly contested by rival factions. The command had its headquarters in brgy Behind the Clouds.  Major Ingeniero and his force played a pivotal role in the Battle of the Visayas and capture of Bohol.

Geography

Climate 
Like most of the municipalities of the province, the climate in Batuan falls within Coronas climate type IV, characterized by not very pronounced maximum rainfall with a short dry season from one to three months and a wet season of nine to ten months. The dry season starts in February and lasts up to April sometimes extending to the middle of May. The heaviest rainfalls are from June to August. It is usually cold during the night in the area. Batuan is generally out of the typhoon belt area and very seldom experiences typhoons.

Hydrogeology 
The entire area of Batuan is covered by two sedimentary rock formations: Maribojoc Limestone, occupying , % of its total land area, and Carmen formation, occupying , %.

Batuan is entirely within the Loboc River Basin. Two tributaries of Loboc river – the Pagbathan and the Bayog – flow east–west into the main river course.

Agriculture

This is the main source of livelihood in the locality where a great portion of its income is derived from crop production, livestock and poultry raising. Rice and corn are the principal crops grown in the area. Coconut, fruits root crops and leafy vegetables come next. Despite the absence of effective irrigation facilities,  (% of agricultural land) are devoted to rice production, with an average production of 60 cavans per hectare. (%) are devoted to corn production. Coffee and cacao are among the industrial crops grown in the locality. Just launched by the LGU is the Fish Culture Farming program designed to encourage smallholders to develop small backyard fishponds to address the scarce supply and high costs of fish in the area.

Climate

Barangays 

Batuan comprises 15 barangays:

Demographics

Batuan's working age or economically active population age 15–64, comprises 58% of its total population, while its dependent population, aged  and 65 years and above, comprises 42%.

Economy

Transport

Bus companies present in Batuan such as Southern Star Bus Transit, Clynn Trans, Chatto Trans, and other companies, provide the town mass transportation within its boundaries and to other towns and city. Two major routes are present in Batuan, namely: Loay Interior Road and Balilihan-Hanopol-Batuan Road, which connects Batuan to adjacent towns and the provincial capital Tagbilaran.

Trade, commerce and industry

Commercial and trading transactions in Batuan gravitate to the urban area, considered the town's Central Business District. However, commercial and trading activities in the area are brisk. Commercial activities in Batuan pass through a network of various commercial establishments. Sari-sari stores are the most common. Other are bakeries, eateries, drugstores, farm and poultry stores, and hardware stores. Service provider in the area include iron works, welding shops, repair shops, furniture factories & communication facilities. Among the ubiquitous industries of Batuan are the rice and corn mills located mainly in the Poblacion areas. Other than those, industrial activities are minimal.

There are no facilities and establishments that cater to the needs and wants of the industry. Batuan also has the Camanayon Mountain.

Government

Welfare
All barangays have their day care centers where services are provided by daycare workers on a regular basis, a program financially supported by the LGU aside from other programs like supplemental feeding, emergency assistance, and burial assistance.

The Municipal Health Office (MHO) is staffed by one doctor, five midwives, a nurse, a medical (laboratory) technologist, a sanitary inspector, and a dentist who reports only twice a week due to budget constraints. A team of Barangay Health Workers has been organized in all barangays to help facilitate and speed up the delivery of basic health services even in the remote areas. There are only three Barangay Health stations in the whole area. An ambulance is on stand-by for emergency uses.

Protective services
For the maintenance of peace and order in the area, the LGU has a local PNP station headed by a police chief with ten (10) junior PNP personnel, equipped with some high-powered firearms and two patrol cars. The local PNP force is assisted in this regard by tanod members of each composite barangay as far as law and order are concerned at barangay level. The LGU however has neither existing or available personnel nor equipment for fire protection purposes.

Education
There are eighteen learning institutions in Batuan of which nine are primary schools, six elementary schools, four public and two private high schools, providing secondary education. Batuan Colleges Inc., a privately owned college school offering technical and short courses in a close tie-up with TESDA, has been in operation since mid2000s.

Notes

References

Sources

External links 

 [ Philippine Standard Geographic Code]
Municipality of Batuan
 Batuan

Municipalities of Bohol